K-9 Mail is free and open source email client for Android. It is designed as an alternative to the stock email clients included with the platform; it supports both POP3 and IMAP protocols and supports IMAP IDLE for real-time notifications. The project is named after the Doctor Who character K9.

In 2015 the project received $86,000 of funding from the Open Technology Fund.

On 13 June 2022, it was announced that K-9 Mail had been taken over by MZLA Technologies Corporation, a subsidiary of the Mozilla Foundation with current maintainer Christian Ketterer joining the team, and plans for K-9 Mail to be rebranded as Thunderbird for Android following the completion of a feature roadmap, including sync with Thunderbird on PC, integrating Thunderbird's automated account setup system, message filtering, and improvements to folders.

Reception
This application has been downloaded from the Google Play Store between 5 million and 10 million times since its release and has been rated by over 90,000 people with almost as many 1 star reviews as 5 star reviews many due to the fundamental restructuring of the program in August 2021, which was not widely accepted by the user base and more recently because of unacceptable battery usage when using push to fetch mail. It has been widely reviewed, and was particularly praised in the media between 2011 and 2013 as a replacement for the default mail application.

Features
 Works with IMAP, POP3
 Folder Sync
 Encryption with OpenKeychain support
 Signatures
 SD Card Storage

Missing features
 The application does not allow viewing the sender name and sender e-mail address at the same time when viewing an e-mail. Its either display the sender name or display the sender e-mail address.
 The application does not allow text mode reading of e-mails, meaning web content in e-mails will render, posing a security risk.
 The application does not allow the viewing of e-mail source code.
 The application does not allow composing an e-mail mono-spaced font, which makes it difficult to include Ascii Art or just simply align items in a list.
 The application does not allow switching off automatically opening HTML attachments, which might expose the user to phishing.

See also 

Comparison of email clients
Firefox for Android

References

External links
Official Website
Github Development
Wiki Page

Free and open-source Android software
Free email software